Yverdon District was a district of the canton of Vaud in Switzerland until 2006 when it was dissolved. It was divided into the Cercles of Molondin, Belmont-sur-Yverdon, Yverdon and Champvent.

The district consisted of 38 municipalities, is 156.68 km² in area and was home to 34,929 inhabitants at the end of 2003.

Mergers and name changes
 On 1 January 2005 the former municipality of Arrissoules merged into the municipality of Rovray.
 On 1 September 2006 the municipalities of Belmont-sur-Yverdon, Bioley-Magnoux, Chamblon, Champvent, Chanéaz, Chavannes-le-Chêne, Chêne-Pâquier, Cheseaux-Noréaz, Cronay, Cuarny, Démoret, Donneloye, Épendes (VD), Essert-Pittet, Essert-sous-Champvent, Gossens, Gressy, Mathod, Mézery-près-Donneloye, Molondin, Montagny-près-Yverdon, Orges, Orzens, Pomy, Prahins, Rovray, Suchy, Suscévaz, Treycovagnes, Ursins, Valeyres-sous-Montagny, Valeyres-sous-Ursins, Villars-Epeney, Villars-sous-Champvent, Vugelles-La Mothe, Yverdon-les-Bains, and Yvonand came from the District d'Yverdon to join the Jura-Nord vaudois District
 On 1 September 2006 the municipality of Oppens came from the District d'Yverdon to join the Gros-de-Vaud District.

Yverdon

Cercle of Belmont-sur-Yverdon

Cercle of Champvent

Cercle of Molondin

Cercle of Yverdon

References

Former districts of the canton of Vaud